Recompense is a 1925 American silent drama film directed by Harry Beaumont and written by Dorothy Farnum. It is based on the 1924 novel Recompense by Robert Keable. The film stars Marie Prevost, Monte Blue, John Roche, George Siegmann, Charles Stevens, and Virginia Brown Faire. The film was released by Warner Bros. on April 26, 1925.

Plot
As described in a film magazine review, clergyman Peter leaves the pulpit to enter World War 1 to be near Julie, the woman he loves. They are separated, but after the war she nurses him through a long illness. He will not marry her because it would hinder the humanitarian work that he plans. She keeps her faith in him, which prompts him to return to her and marry her.

Cast

Box office
According to Warner Bros., the film earned $226,000 domestically and $37,000 in foreign markets.

Preservation
With no prints of Recompense located in any film archive, it is a lost film.

References

External links

 
 
 Lantern slide

1925 films
1920s English-language films
Silent American drama films
1925 drama films
Warner Bros. films
Films directed by Harry Beaumont
Lost American films
American silent feature films
1925 lost films
Lost drama films
1920s American films